Steven Krilis  (born 26 November 1947, in Athens, Greece) is Professor of Immunology Allergies and Infectious diseases at the University of New South Wales and St George Hospital in Sydney, Australia. He is a Fellow of the Royal Australasian College of Physicians.

Krilis specializes in the treatment and research of Antiphospholipid syndrome; his laboratory was the first to recognise the major auto-antigen involved.  In 2004, after a decade of research, Krilis led a team of researchers which identified a mechanism that can cause blood clots – a discovery with implications for those susceptible to deep-vein thrombosis, strokes, recurrent miscarriages and Antiphospholipid syndrome.

Krillis was made a Member of the Order of Australia (AM) in the 2019 Queen's Birthday Honours in recognition of his "significant service to medical research in the areas of inflammation, thrombosis and allergic disease".

Publications
Among his over 120 peer-reviewed papers, the most cited are:
McNeil, H.P., Simpson, R.J., Chesterman, C.N., Krilis, S.A."Anti-phospholipid antibodies are directed against a complex antigen that includes a lipid-binding inhibitor of coagulation: β2-glycoprotein I (apolipoprotein H)" (1990) Proceedings of the National Academy of Sciences of the United States of America, 87 (11), pp. 4120–4124. Cited 920 times. 
McNeil, H.P., Chesterman, C.N., Krilis, S.A. "Immunology and clinical importance of antiphospholipid antibodies" (1991) Advances in Immunology, 49, pp. 193–280. Cited 284 times.
Hunt, J., Krilis, S. "The fifth domain of β2-glycoprotein I contains a phospholipid binding site (Cys281-Cys288) and a region recognized by anticardiolipin antibodies" (1994) Journal of Immunology, 152 (2), pp. 653–659. Cited 195 times. 
Hunt, J.E., McNeil, H.P., Morgan, G.J., Crameri, R.M., Krilis, S.A. "A phospholipid-beta 2-glycoprotein I complex is an antigen for anticardiolipin antibodies occurring in autoimmune disease but not with infection." (1992) Lupus 1 (2), pp. 75–81. Cited 147 times.
Miyakis, S., Lockshin, M.D., Atsumi, T., Branch, D.W., Brey, R.L., Cervera, R., Derkesen, R.H.W.M., De Groot, P.G., Koike, T., Meroni, P.L., Reber, G., Shoenfeld, Y., Tincani, A., Vlachoyiannopoulos, P.G., Krilis, S.A. "International consensus statement on an update of the classification criteria for definite antiphospholipid syndrome (APS)" (2006) Journal of Thrombosis and Haemostasis 4 (2), pp. 295–306. Cited 116 times.  
Hunt, J.E., Simpson, R.J., Krilis, S.A. "Identification of a region of β2-glycoprotein I critical for lipid binding and anti-cardiolipin antibody cofactor activity" (1993) Proceedings of the National Academy of Sciences of the United States of America 90 (6), pp. 2141–2145. Cited 111 times.

References

External links 
 UNSW Position details and research interests

1947 births
Living people
University of New South Wales Medical School alumni
Members of the Order of Australia